"Je vous aime adieu" (English: "I love you goodbye") is a 1996 song recorded by the French singer Hélène Ségara. It was her second single, and the first from her first album, Cœur de verre. Released in April 1996, it was a success in France and Belgium, but did not reach the top ten.

Song information
The lyrics were written by Hélène Segara and Christian Vié, and the music was composed by Thierry Geoffroy and Christian Loigerot. The song deals with the departure of the singer from the French Riviera to Paris where she lived at the time. The B-side is Ségara's first single, "Loin", released in 1993, but which was a relative failure as it did not reach the charts.

"Je vous aime adieu" was performed during Ségara's first tour and thus is included on the live album En concert à l'Olympia, the sixth track on the first CD. It was also included on Ségara's 2004 compilation album, Le Best of (17th track).

Chart performances
In France, the single started at number 34 on 27 April 1996 and reached a peak of number 13 in its 12th week. It dropped slowly on the chart and remained in the top 20 for 15 weeks and in the top 50 for 21 weeks. It was certified a Silver disc by the SNEP.

"Je vous aime adieu" charted for 15 weeks on the Belgian (Wallonia) Ultratop 40 Singles Chart: it debuted at number 31 on 10 August and reached number 16 two weeks later. Although it did not climb higher, it remained for seven weeks in the top 20 and became the 72nd best-selling single of the year.

Track listings
 CD single

 Digital download

Charts and sales

Peak positions

Year-end charts

Certifications and sales

References

External links
 "Je vous aime adieu", lyrics + music video

Songs about parting
1996 singles
Hélène Ségara songs
1996 songs
East West Records singles